The notifiable diseases in Canada at present are as follows:

Past notifiable diseases

Source

Canada
Health law in Canada